The 1955 Cal Aggies football team represented the College of Agriculture at Davis—now known as the University of California, Davis—as a member of the Far Western Conference (FWC) during the 1955 college football season. Led by Ted Forbes, who returned for his six and final season as head coach after having helmed the team from 1949 to 1953, the Aggies compiled an overall record of 5–3–1 with a mark of 3–1–1 in conference play, placing second in the FWC. The team outscored its opponents 128 to 79 for the season. The Cal Aggies played home games at Aggie Field in Davis, California.

In six seasons under Forbes, the Cal Aggies compiled an overall record of 21–29–2, for a winning percentage of .423. His teams won the FWC title in 1949 and 1951 and appeared in a postseason bowl game, the Pear Bowl, in both of those seasons.

Schedule

Notes

References

Cal Aggies
UC Davis Aggies football seasons
Cal Aggies football